This is a list of current bridges and other crossings of the River Aire and are listed from source downstream to the river's mouth.

Crossings

Source to Apperley Bridge

Calverley to Knowsthorpe

Stourton to river mouth

Gallery

See also
List of crossings of the River Calder

Notes

References

Sources

Aire
Lists of bridges in the United Kingdom
Aire
Lists of buildings and structures in West Yorkshire